Nicolas Philibert (born 10 January 1951) is a French film director and actor.

Biography
Philibert was born in Nancy, France. He studied philosophy in the University of Grenoble. Philibert's father was a film lecturer and he attended his talks in his youth, which encouraged him to embark on a career in the film industry. He started it with filmmaker René Allio in 1970, as a trainee on Les Camisards and then as an assistant on Rude Journée pour la reine (1973), and assistant-director on Moi, Pierre Rivière, ayant égorgé ma mère, ma sœur et mon frère... (1975).

In 1978 he co-directed with Gérard Mordillat a feature documentary His Master's Voice, in which a dozen bosses of big industrial groups discuss power, leadership, hierarchies and the role of unions.

Between 1985 and 1987, he made several films about mountains and adventure for TV, then turned to making feature-length documentaries for theatrical distribution: La Ville Louvre (1990), Le Pays des sourds (1992), Un animal, des animaux (1995), La Moindre des choses (1996)  - at the psychiatric clinic of La Borde, as well as an experimental film with the pupils of the theatre school Théâtre national de Strasbourg, Qui sait? (1998).

In 2001, Nicolas Philibert made Être et avoir, about daily life in a single class school on a small village in the Auvergne. It won the Prix Louis Delluc 2002, and became a box office and critical success in France and internationally. The film was screened out of competition at the 2002 Cannes Film Festival.

With Retour en Normandie (2007), he revisited the traces of a previous films, made thirty years earlier by René Allio, with local peasants playing the lead roles. With Nénette (2010), made at the Ménagerie du Jardin des plantes in Paris, he produced an intimated portrait of the most famous of its inhabitants a female orang-utang, Nénette, held in captivity for 36 years.

La Maison de la radio (2013), takes us into the heart of the French Radio headquarters in Paris,  finding out who inhabits  the place and discovering the mysteries of its long corridors.

Over the last fifteen years there have been more than 120 retrospectives or 'homages' to Philibert organised internationally including the British Film Institute (London) and the Museum of Modern Art (New York).

He was one of the directors invited to nominate his favourite films in the British Film Institute's 2012 poll.

He explains, in French, his motivations, his influences (including Agnès Varda) and the history of his career as a documentary film maker, especially the 'impermeable' frontiers between documentary and drama in an interview recorded in April 2012.

Filmography
 La voix de son maître (1978)
 Vas-y Lapébie! (1988)
 La ville Louvre (1990)
 Le pays des sourds (1992)
 Un animal, des animaux (1996)
 La moindre des choses (1997)
 Qui sait? (1999)
 Être et avoir (2002)
 Retour en Normandie (2007)
 Nénette (2010)
 La maison de la radio (2013)
 On the Adamant (2023)

References

External links
 (French)

1951 births
Living people
French film directors
French male film actors
Grenoble Alpes University alumni
Actors from Nancy, France
Mass media people from Nancy, France